Second unit is a discrete team of filmmakers tasked with filming shots or sequences of a production, separate from the main or "first" unit. The second unit will often shoot simultaneously with the other unit or units, allowing the filming stage of production to be completed faster.

Function 
The functions of the second unit vary, but typically the first unit films the key face-to-face drama between the principal actors. Two frequent ways a second unit is used are:
 Action sequences: Action sequences are often filmed in discrete locations, using stunt performers, rather than the principal cast, and requiring significantly different filming arrangements than for ordinary scenes. Therefore, they are an opportunity for second unit shooting. 
 "Pick-ups": After the main unit has finished on a set or location, there may be shots that require some or all of this setting as background but that do not require the principal actors. These shots may include things such as close-ups, inserts, cutaways, and establishing shots.

In both of these scenarios, the purpose of the second unit is to make the most efficient use of some of the resources that are expensive or scarce in film production: actors' and directors' shooting time, sound stage usage and the cost of sets that may have been built on stages.

The work of second units should not be confused with multiple-camera setups, where several cameras film the same scene simultaneously. Large productions may have multiple second units. Although filmmakers may refer to having "three or four units working", each unit would be called an "additional second unit"; usually none would be described as the third or fourth unit.

Directors 
The second unit has its own director and cinematographer. A key skill for a second unit director is to be able to follow the style being set by the film's primary director. Peter MacDonald, second unit director on X-Men Origins: Wolverine, The Bourne Ultimatum, and Harry Potter and the Goblet of Fire, has said, "The most important thing about any second unit is that you can't tell the difference between the second unit and the first unit.  It must have the stamp of the first unit, both in photography and the style of direction. ... You try to copy what the first unit does as much as possible.  You mustn't be on an ego trip and try to do your own style, because your material has to cut into theirs and it mustn't jar, it must fit in exactly so no-one can tell the difference." Brett Ratner, commenting about Conrad Palmisano, who directed second unit for Ratner on Rush Hour 3 and After the Sunset, said, "He has the understanding of what it takes to create a great action sequence and never deviate from the story or the tone of the film."

Because second units often film scenes with stunts and special effects in action movies, the job of stunt coordinator is often combined with that of second unit director.  Many second unit directors were stunt coordinators first, including Vic Armstrong, who has directed second unit on The Amazing Spider-Man, Mission: Impossible III, and War of the Worlds; Simon Crane, who did Men in Black 3, Frankenstein, and X-Men: The Last Stand; and Terry J. Leonard, responsible for second unit on Cowboys & Aliens, The Expendables, and Die Hard with a Vengeance.

Second unit director can be a stepping stone for aspiring directors to gain experience. Unlike an assistant director, who is second-in-command to the main director, a second unit director operates independently. Second unit directors who have gone on to become full-fledged film directors include former editors Peter Hunt (Goldfinger), John Glen (On Her Majesty's Secret Service), stunt coordinator David R. Ellis (Final Destination 2), and Frank Marshall, who directed second unit for Steven Spielberg whilst also working as producer, on Indiana Jones and the Last Crusade, Empire of the Sun, and The Color Purple.  Some who became directors may return to working predominantly as second unit directors for the remainder of their career.  Notable examples include Yakima Canutt (Ben-Hur, 1959) and Michael D. Moore, who worked on more than sixty films, including Butch Cassidy and the Sundance Kid (1969), Patton (1970), and the first three Indiana Jones films in the 1980s.

It is common for certain personnel involved with a production in another capacity to also function as a second unit director, benefiting from their understanding of the material and relationship with the production's director or producers.  For example, English actor Andy Serkis, who plays Gollum, was second unit director on Peter Jackson's three-part adaptation of J.R.R. Tolkien's fantasy novel The Hobbit.  Actor George Peppard, whilst the star of the detective drama Banacek, also served as second unit director for several episodes of the series.

A notable exception to having more than one filming unit is director Christopher Nolan, who has avoided the use of a second unit in movies such as The Dark Knight and Inception, preferring instead to oversee every shot personally with cinematographer Wally Pfister.

References

Filmmaking occupations
Film production

sv:Filmproduktion#Inspelning